Affinities is a 1922 American silent comedy drama film directed by Ward Lascelle and starring John Bowers, Colleen Moore and Joe Bonner.

Cast
 John Bowers as Day Illington
 Colleen Moore as Fanny Illington
 Joe Bonner as Fred Jackson
 Grace Gordon as Ida Jackson
 Pietro Sosso as Professor Savage
 E.H. Calvert

References

Bibliography
 Munden, Kenneth White. The American Film Institute Catalog of Motion Pictures Produced in the United States, Part 1. University of California Press, 1997.

External links
 

1922 films
1922 comedy films
1920s English-language films
American silent feature films
American black-and-white films
Films directed by Ward Lascelle
Films distributed by W. W. Hodkinson Corporation
1920s American films
Silent American comedy films